Auser may refer to:
Autogestione servizi SPI, an Italian association for the self-employed formally associated with the Italian General Confederation of Labour (CGIL) 
the Latin name of the river Serchio, in the Italian region of Tuscany